Minister of Infrastructure may refer to:

 Minister for Infrastructure and Transport (Australia)
 Minister for Infrastructure, Transport and Networks (Greece)
 National Infrastructure Minister of Israel
 Italian Minister of Infrastructures
 Minister of Land, Infrastructure, Transport and Tourism, Japan
 Minister of Infrastructure (Manitoba), Canada
 Minister of Infrastructure and Transportation (Manitoba) (1999–2016)
 Minister of Infrastructure and the Environment, Netherlands
 Minister for Infrastructure (New Zealand)
 Minister for Infrastructure, Planning and Logistics (Northern Territory), Canada
 Minister of Infrastructure (Ontario), Canada
 Cabinet Secretary for Infrastructure, Investment and Cities, Scotland
 Minister for Infrastructure (Sweden)
 Minister of Infrastructure (Ukraine)